In Shop We Build Electric Chairs: Professional Music by Nightwalker 1984–1993 is an album by Nightwalker, a pseudonym for archival Guided by Voices recordings, a side project by Robert Pollard, released in 1999.

Track listing
All songs written by Robert Pollard unless otherwise noted.
 "Drum Solo" – 0:55
 "The Fink Swan (Swims Away)" (R. Pollard, Jim Pollard) – 2:46
 "Kenneth Ray" (R. Pollard, J. Pollard, Mitch Mitchell) – 2:54
 "Dogwood Grains" – 1:07
 "Amazed" (R. Pollard, J. Pollard) – 2:23
 "Signifying UFO" – 0:20
 "Ceramic Cock Einstein" – 6:08
 "U235" – 0:23
 "Weird Rivers & Sapphire Sun" – 2:53
 "Trashed Canned Goods" – 1:40
 "Those Little Bastards Will Bite" – 11:08

Personnel
Robert Pollard – lead vocals and instruments
Jim Pollard – instruments
Mitch Mitchell – instruments
Tobin Sprout – guitar on "Trashed Canned Goods"
Dan Toohey – bass on "Trashed Canned Goods"

References

1999 albums